We–Galician Candidacy was an electoral alliance of Galician nationalist parties formed ahead of the 2015 Spanish general election by the Galician Nationalist Bloc (BNG), Galician Coalition (CG), Galicianist Party (PG), Communist Party of the Galician People (PCPG) and Galician Workers' Front (FOGA). The alliance failed in securing parliamentary representation in the general election, leaving the BNG out of the Congress of Deputies for the first time in 20 years.

History
The alliance had its roots in the "Initiative for the Union" citizen platform (IxU), which grouped the Galician Nationalist Bloc (BNG), Galician Coalition (CG), Galicianist Party (PG), Communist Party of the Galician People (PCPG) and Galician Workers' Front (FOGA) around the common goal of contesting the 2015 Spanish general election under a joint candidacy comprising all Galician nationalist parties. Negotiations with the parties coalescing around the similarly-purposed "Citizen Meeting for a Galician Tide" platform foundered, and the parties within the IxU platform agreed to run on their own under the "We–Galician Candidacy" label. The BNG agreed to renounce to its trademark and dilute it into a larger umbrella, as well as giving up all media presence rights and economic support in favour of the alliance, which it defended as "the only true choice" for a Galician-only candidacy. Carlos Callón was selected as the candidacy's leading candidate, running in the A Coruña constituency, with old members from CG and the PG also being included in the lists.

After the negative results in the 2015 election, the BNG chose to recover its trademark ahead of the 2016 general election. The PG and CG dropped out from the list, and the alliance was rearranged as a supplement to the BNG, but on 26 June it underperformed its previous 2015 result. The alliance's structure was maintained ahead of the 2016 Galician regional election.

On 27 January 2017, the FOGA was integrated as an internal current within the BNG.

Composition

Electoral performance

Cortes Generales

Nationwide

Regional breakdown

Notes

References

2015 establishments in Galicia (Spain)
2016 disestablishments in Galicia (Spain)
Defunct political party alliances in Spain
Galician nationalist parties
Left-wing nationalist parties
Political parties established in 2015
Political parties disestablished in 2016
Political parties in Galicia (Spain)